The Ivan Rogov class, Soviet designation Project 1174 Nosorog (Rhino), is a class of landing ships (large landing ship in Soviet classification) built in the Soviet Union. The ships were built as a part of expansion of the Soviet Navy's amphibious warfare capabilities in the 1970s.

Project 1174 has both bow ramp and well deck; it may operate as either a LST or as a LPD. A typical load is one battalion of 520 marines and 25 tanks. Up to 53 tanks or 80 armoured personnel carriers may be carried if the well deck is used for ground vehicle parking. In total, 2,500 tons of cargo may be carried.

History
Mitrofan Moskalenko was decommissioned after the Russian Ministry of Defence determined modernization would be as costly as buying a new ship.

Both Aleksandr Nikolayev and Mitrofan Moskalenko were put to the auction for scrapping in 2014. In 2015, with the decision of the French government to not deliver two ordered Mistral-class amphibious assault ships for the Russian Navy, it was considered to temporarily replace the Mistrals with the last two Project 1174 ships that are still in reserve.

On May 27, 2019 the Mitrofan Moskalenko caught fire at the shipyard in the port of Severomorsk.

Mitrofan Moskalenko was towed from Severomorsk to Murmansk for scrapping in May 2019.

Aleksandr Nikolayeev is still kept preserved as of Autumn 2019, despite scrapping tender being been published in April 2016.

Electronics and sensors
 E-Band Surveillance Radar
 Two I-Band Navigation Radars
 G-Band Fire Control Radar (for 76mm Gun)
 H/I-Band Fire Control Radar (for 30mm Guns)
 F/H/I-Band Fire Control Radar (for Osa-M Missile System)
 17 channel radio suite
 Optronic Fire Control System
 Electronic Warfare System with Electronic Support Measures (ESM)

Ships

See also
 List of ships of the Soviet Navy
 List of ships of Russia by project number

References

External links
 Ivan Rogov Class (Type 1174) Landing Ship, Russia
 Ivan Rogov class Amphibious Warfare ship on FAS.org
 Ivan Rogov class Amphibious Warfare ship on GlobalSecurity.org
 All Ivan Rogov class landing ships - Complete Ship List

Amphibious warfare vessel classes
 Ivan Rogov class landing ship
 Ivan Rogov class landing ship
 Ivan Rogov class landing ship